Megalichthyiformes is an extinct clade of basal tetrapodomorphs which first appeared during the Devonian period. It was named in 2010 by Michael I. Coates and Matt Friedman, who defined it as a stem-based taxon containing all tetrapodomorphs closer to Megalichthys than to Eusthenopteron.

Below is a cladogram showing Megalichthyiformes modified from Swartz (2012).

References 

 
Devonian bony fish
Carboniferous bony fish
Permian bony fish